Hungry ghosts are a concept in Buddhism and in Chinese traditional religion.

Hungry Ghost(s) or hungry ghost(s)may also refer to:

Books
 Hungry Ghosts (novel), a 2023 novel by Kevin Jared Hosein 
Hungry Ghosts: Mao's Secret Famine, by Jasper Becker

Film, television and radio
The Hungry Ghosts, a 2009 American film by Michael Imperioli
  Hungry Ghosts (TV series), a 2020 Australian television series
The Hungry Ghosts, part 2 of the 1998 and 2000 radio drama Midnight at the Casa Luna

Music
Hungry Ghosts (band), a Hong Kong rock band formed in 2007

Albums
Hungry Ghost (album), 2013 album by Violent Soho
Hungry Ghosts (album), 2014 album by OK Go
Hungry Ghosts, 2005 album by Doug Cox

Songs

"Hungry Ghost", by Blank Banshee on the album MEGA
"Hungry Ghost", by Brad Mehldau
"Hungry Ghost", by Hurray For The Riff Raff
"Hungry Ghost", by Scars on Broadway, released as a B-side on the single "They Say"
"Hungry Ghost", by STRFKR
"Hungry Ghosts", by DJ Logic
"Hungry Ghosts!", by Mudboy

Other uses
Preta, a type of supernatural being described in Hinduism, Buddhism, Taoism, and Chinese and Vietnamese folk religion, also known as hungry ghost

See also 
 Ghost Festival, also known as Hungry Ghost Festival, a festival held in some East Asian countries
In the Realm of Hungry Ghosts: Close Encounters with Addiction, a book by Gabor Maté
A Month of Hungry Ghosts, a 2008 Singaporean film
Scroll of Hungry Ghosts, a Japanese National Treasure painting
Segaki, a ritual of Japanese Buddhism sometimes translated as "feeding the hungry ghosts"